Bušovice is a municipality and village in Rokycany District in the Plzeň Region of the Czech Republic. It has about 600 inhabitants.

Administrative parts
Villages of Sedlecko and Střapole are administrative parts of Bušovice.

References

Villages in Rokycany District